The caroticotympanic nerves are nerves which supply the eardrum ("tympanum") and carotid canal. They are the postganglionic sympathetic fibers from internal carotid plexus which enter the tympanic cavity via the caroticotympanic artery. These fibers join the tympanic plexus which are located on the surface of the promontory.

See also
 Caroticotympanic arteries

Auditory system
Nerves